ASU Preparatory Academy, Casa Grande is a University-preparatory school in the Arizona State University Preparatory Academy, located in Casa Grande, Arizona, United States.

The ASU Preparatory Academy, Casa Grande High School is part of a series of preparatory schools for Arizona State University, including ASU Preparatory Academy, Phoenix, ASU Preparatory Academy, Polytechnic and ASU Prep Digital.

Sports 
In 2017, FC Barcelona announced the opening of the Barça Academy at Casa Grande High School. It is projected to host 100 students.

The Barca Residence Academy players including Caden Clark, Julian Araujo, Matte Hoppe and more professional American players.

References 

Arizona State University
Public high schools in Arizona
Charter schools in Arizona
Schools in Pinal County, Arizona
Buildings and structures in Casa Grande, Arizona
2016 establishments in Arizona
Educational institutions established in 2016